"The Kind of Love We Make" is a song by American country music singer Luke Combs. It was released in June 2022 as the second single from his third studio album Growin' Up. Combs wrote the song with Jamie Davis, Dan Isbell, and Reid Isbell, and co-produced it with Chip Matthews and Jonathan Singleton.

Content
Billy Dukes of Taste of Country described the song as Combs' "first bedroom song", comparing it favorably to the work of Billy Currington. He also described it as mixing a contemporary R&B sound with mainstream country music. Jon Freeman of Rolling Stone Country also compared it to Currington, calling it "a bit of a stylistic turn".

Music video
The accompanying music video was released on June 16, 2022. It follows the parallel stories of an older and younger couple. The younger couple struggles to make time for each other due to their demanding schedules as a firefighter and a paramedic, until they are summoned to respond to a fire that has erupted at the older couple's home. The home was completely damaged, but miraculously the occupants were unharmed, likely not even aware of the fire due to getting lost in each other while dancing.

Commercial performance
"The Kind of Love We Make" debuted at number 18 on the Billboard Country Airplay chart dated June 25, 2022. It is Combs' second-highest debut there after "Beer Never Broke My Heart", which debuted at number 15 in May 2019. The following week, it debuted at number two on the same publication's Hot Country Songs charts. This was also Combs' second-highest debut on that chart after "Forever After All", which debuted in the number one position in November 2020. Despite its high debut on the Country Airplay chart, it reached a peak of number two on that chart, becoming Combs' first single to miss number one, and ending a record-breaking streak of thirteen consecutive career-opening number one singles that started with his debut single "Hurricane" in May 2017, having been blocked by Cole Swindell's "She Had Me at Heads Carolina". It did, however, reach number one on the Hot Country Songs chart.

Charts

Weekly charts

Year-end charts

Certifications

References

2022 songs
2022 singles
Luke Combs songs
Songs written by Luke Combs
Columbia Records singles